Mallonia pauper is a species of beetle in the family Cerambycidae. It was described by Karl Jordan in 1903. It is known from Angola.

References

Endemic fauna of Angola
Pachystolini
Beetles described in 1903
Taxa named by Karl Jordan